HD 83443 is an orange dwarf star approximately 134 light-years away in the constellation of Vela. As of 2000, at least one extrasolar planet has been confirmed to be orbiting the star. The star HD 83443 is named Kalausi. The name was selected in the NameExoWorlds campaign by Kenya, during the 100th anniversary of the IAU. The word Kalausi means a very strong whirling column of wind in the Dholuo language.

Planetary system 
The planet HD 83443 b was discovered in 2000 by the Geneva Extrasolar Planet Search Team led by Michel Mayor. It has a minimum mass comparable to Saturn's, and its orbit at the time of discovery was one of the shortest known taking only three days to complete one revolution around the star. This hot Jupiter is likely to be slightly larger than Jupiter in radius.

In 2000, the same year that planet b was found, another planet around HD 83443 was announced by the Geneva Team. The new planet was designated as "HD 83443 c". It had a mass smaller than planet b and a short, very eccentric orbit. Its orbital period, 28.9 days, was especially interesting, because it indicated a 10:1 orbital resonance between the planets.  However, a team led by astronomer Paul Butler did not detect any signal indicating the existence of the second planet. New observations by the Geneva team could not detect the signal either and the discovery claim had to be retracted. The origin of the signal, which was "highly significant" in the earlier data, is not yet clear. Another planet, designated HD 83443 c, was discovered in 2022 in a wide, eccentric 22-year orbit. It is suspected that HD 83443 c entered its current orbit due to the inward migration of HD 83443 b.

References

External links 
 

K-type main-sequence stars
Planetary systems with two confirmed planets
Vela (constellation)
CD–42 5452
083443
047202
Kalausi
J09371182-4316198